The 1920 South Carolina United States Senate election was held on November 2, 1920 to select the U.S. Senator from the state of South Carolina.  Incumbent Democratic Senator Ellison D. Smith won the Democratic primary and was unopposed in the general election to win another six-year term.

Democratic primary

Candidates
W.C. Irby
William P. Pollock, former interim U.S. Senator and State Representative from Cheraw
Ellison D. Smith, incumbent Senator since 1909
 George Warren, resident of Hampton

Smith was the leader in the first primary election on August 31 and won the runoff election two weeks later on September 14.  There was no opposition to the Democratic candidate in the general election so Smith was elected to another six-year term in the Senate.

Results

Runoff

General election results

|-
| 
| colspan=5 |Democratic hold
|-

See also
List of United States senators from South Carolina
1920 United States Senate elections
1920 United States House of Representatives elections in South Carolina
1920 South Carolina gubernatorial election

References

"Report of the Secretary of State to the General Assembly of South Carolina.  Part II." Reports of State Officers Boards and Committees to the General Assembly of the State of South Carolina. Volume I. Columbia, SC: 1921, p. 62.

1920
South Carolina
1920 South Carolina elections
1920